The Damned is a 2002 Czech drama film directed by Dan Svátek. It was entered into the 24th Moscow International Film Festival.

Cast
 Jan Plouhar as Patrik Lovický
 Jan Révai as Tomás Egermaier
 Isabela Bencová as Elena Dvorová
 Dana Vávrová as Michaela Holubová
 John Comer as Stephen
 Dennis Rudge as Mike
 Erdem Bileg as Rat
 Rob Das as Gert
 Michaela Kuklová as Consul Chalupská
 Borek Sípek as Consul Mazal
 Filip Rajmont as Olaf

References

External links
 

2002 films
2002 drama films
2000s Czech-language films
Czech drama films
2000s Czech films